Benford Milo "Ben" Gardner (October 18, 1919 – May 13, 1985) was an American professional basketball player. He played for the Fort Wayne Zollner Pistons and Anderson Duffey Packers in the National Basketball League during the 1946–47 season and averaged 0.4 points per game.

References

1919 births
1985 deaths
American men's basketball players
American military personnel of World War II
Anderson Packers players
Basketball players from Houston
Centers (basketball)
Fort Wayne Zollner Pistons players
Forwards (basketball)
Professional Basketball League of America players
Sam Houston Bearkats men's basketball players